Dimbeswar Das is a Bharatiya Janata Party politician from Assam. He has been elected in Assam Legislative Assembly election in 2016 from Raha constituency.

On 19 January 2017, Das' car was removed by an engineer in Nagaon district for blocking the way to an office. The engineer was made to apologize for the incident by touching Das' feet.

References 

Living people
Bharatiya Janata Party politicians from Assam
Assam MLAs 2016–2021
People from Nagaon district
Year of birth missing (living people)